Moynihan is a New Zealand-Australian television drama series. The series revolves around the professional and personal life of Leo Moynihan, the tough-talking secretary of the Central Carpenters Union.

References

External links
 

Australian Broadcasting Corporation original programming
1976 Australian television series debuts
English-language television shows
TVNZ 1 original programming
1976 New Zealand television series debuts